G. S. Paramashivaiah (Kannada:ಜಿ.ಎಸ್. ಪರಮಶಿವಯ್ಯ)(born: 2 February 1919, at Gubbi, Tumkur District) was an irrigation expert and Chief Engineer from the state of Karnataka, India. He worked in various capacities in the Public Works and Irrigation departments of Karnataka state and retired as a Chief Engineer of the Irrigation Department. He also headed State technical advisory committee on Irrigation.

Paramashivaiah was behind the detailed planning, design and lobbying for the implementation of many irrigation projects including the much debated project of diversion of many west flowing rivers of Karnataka including Netravati River to irrigate the state's parched and semi arid eastern and central parts. He died on 11 March 2014 after a brief illness.

References 

1919 births
People from Tumkur district
Engineers from Karnataka
Kannada people
Indian irrigation engineers
2014 deaths
20th-century Indian engineers